Sokrushitelny was one of 29 s (officially known as Project 7) built for the Soviet Navy during the late 1930s. Completed in 1939, she was initially assigned to the Baltic Fleet before she was transferred to the Northern Fleet in late 1939. After the German invasion of the Soviet Union in June 1941, the ship laid several minefields in the White and Barents Seas. Sokrushitelny spent most of her service escorting the Arctic Convoys, run by the British to provide weapons and supplies to the Soviets, or providing naval gunfire support to Soviet troops along the Arctic coast. The ship only fired at a German ship one time, while defending Convoy QP 13 in early 1942. While escorting Convoy QP 15 in November, she sank during a severe storm after breaking in half. Most of her crew was rescued by other destroyers sent to her aid, although 52 crewmen were lost.

Design and description
Having decided to build the large and expensive   destroyer leaders, the Soviet Navy sought Italian assistance in designing smaller and cheaper destroyers.

Their crew numbered 197 officers and sailors in peacetime and 236 in wartime. The designers had been conservative in rating the turbines and many, but not all, of the ships handily exceeded their designed speed during their sea trials. Others fell considerably short of it, although specific figures for most individual ships have not survived.

As built, the Gnevny-class ships mounted four  B-13 guns in two pairs of superfiring single mounts fore and aft of the superstructure. Anti-aircraft defense was provided by a pair of  34-K AA guns in single mounts and a pair of  21-K AA guns as well as two  DK or DShK machine guns. They carried six  torpedo tubes in two rotating triple mounts; each tube was provided with a reload. The ships could also carry a maximum of either 60 or 95 mines and 25 depth charges. The ships were equipped with two K-1 paravanes intended to destroy mines and a pair of depth-charge throwers.

Construction and service 
Built in Leningrad's Shipyard No. 189 (Ordzhonikidze) as yard number 292, Sokrushitelny was laid down on 29 October 1936, launched on 23 August 1937, and was completed on 13 August 1939. Initially assigned to the Baltic Fleet, she was transferred to the Northern Fleet in November and was refitted at Molotovsk from 18 July 1940 to 4 July 1941. Now assigned to the 1st Destroyer Division of the fleet,  Sokrushitelny, together with her sister ship  and the minelayer , helped to lay 275 mines on 23–24 July at the entrance to the White Sea. The ship rendezvoused with the British minelayer  on 31 July in the Barents Sea and escorted her to Arkhangelsk. From 10 to 18 August, Sokrushitelny escorted convoys along the coast of Karelia. Together with Grozny, she escorted ships full of evacuees from the Arctic island of Spitzbergen through the White Sea to Arkhangelsk on 23–24 August; a week later, Sokrushitelny, Grozny and the destroyers  and  escorted the first supply convoy from Britain to the same destination. On 10–15 September, Sokrushitelny and her sisters in the 1st Destroyer Division (Grozny,  and ) laid a pair of minefields off the Rybachy Peninsula using British mines delivered by Adventure.

On 24 October, the ship bombarded German positions near the Zapadnaya Litsa River with 114 shells from her 130 mm guns. On 29 October, she collided with the minesweeper  in Kola Bay and was under repair for five days. Sokrushitelny bombarded German troops on 6, 9, 16 and 18 November, firing a total of 435 main-gun shells. The ship was assigned to the close escort for Convoy PQ 3 on 23 November. She resumed bombarding German positions between 26 and 30 November, firing 985 shells in four days. Escorted by Sokrushitelny and Grozny, the heavy cruiser  sortied on 17 December in an unsuccessful attempt to intercept the German 8th Destroyer Flotilla that had engaged two British minesweepers attempting to rendezvous with Convoy PQ 6. On 31 December and 1 January 1942, Sokrushitelny fired one hundred 130 mm shells each day at German positions near Motovsky Gulf.

Sokrushitelny and Gremyashchy escorted Convoy PQ 8 into Kola Bay on 20 January and then formed part of the escort for Convoy QP 6 on 24–28 January. Sokrushitelny was refitted from 20 February to 25 March. The same pair of destroyers were sent to escort Convoy PQ 13 four days later. Later that day the convoy was attacked by three destroyers of the 8th Destroyer Flotilla. Sokrushitelny briefly engaged , claiming at least one hit, which was later sunk by a British destroyer. From 10 to 12 April the sisters escorted the homeward-bound Convoy QP 10 and then the incoming Convoy PQ 14 from 17 to 19 April. They formed the local escort for Convoy QP 11 on 28–30 April. After the light cruiser  was torpedoed by a German submarine on 30 April, they reversed course to provide assistance. The destroyers were forced to return to port to refuel on 1 May and put to sea again on the morning of the following day, but returned to base when they received word that Edinburgh had already sunk. On 10 May Sokrushitelny bombarded German positions near the Zapadnaya Litsa River. She escorted Convoy QP 12 on 21–23 May and then helped to escort Convoy PQ 16 on 28–30 May.

The ship unsuccessfully searched in early for ships from Convoy PQ 17 after it had scattered. On 10 July Sokrushitelnys steering gear and rangefinders were damaged by fragments from near misses by German bombers. After repairs, she rendezvoused with Allied ships on 23 August carrying supplies for a pair of British torpedo bomber squadrons that were intended operate in Karelia. On 17–20 September the ship was one of the local escorts for Convoy PQ 18. The following month, Sokrushitelny escorted a freighter from Iokanga to Arkhangelsk on 4–7 November and escorted Convoy QP 15 on 17–20 November. A severe storm struck on the 20th and severed her stern, killing six men. Valerian Kuybyshev, Uritsky and her sister  were sent to her aid and were able to rescue 191 men, although 30 sailors died during the rescue operations. Low on fuel, they were forced to depart on 21 November, leaving the ship, which sank after their departure, with a skeleton crew of 16 men. Most of the officers abandoned ship before the crewmen; the captain was shot for cowardice and the executive officer was sent to a penal battalion.

Citations

Sources

Further reading
 

Gnevny-class destroyers
1937 ships
Ships built at the Baltic Shipyard
World War II shipwrecks in the Arctic Ocean
Maritime incidents in November 1942